Boskey is a surname. Notable people with the surname include:

Bennett Boskey (1916–2016), American lawyer
Jayantbhai Patel Boskey, Indian politician

See also
Bosley (surname)